Thorin (also called thoron or thoronol) is an indicator used in the determination of barium, beryllium, lithium, uranium and thorium compounds.  Being a compound of arsenic, it is highly toxic.

References

External links
 MSDS at Oxford University

Azo compounds
Naphthalenesulfonates
Organic sodium salts
2-Naphthols
Titration
Arsonic acids